Matthew Bacon Sellers II (March 29, 1869 – April 5, 1932) was a United States inventor and scientist known for his work in the field of aviation.

Biography

He was born on March 29, 1869, in Baltimore, Maryland to Matthew Bacon Sellers I. 

In 1915 he joined the Naval Consulting Board.

He died on April 5, 1932 in Ardsley-on-Hudson, New York.

Sellers quadruplane
Sellers was interested in low-powered flight. He constructed a staggered quadruplane capable of flight on only 5 hp. He flew it at least from 1909 to 1912 and published his researches.

References

Aviation inventors
1869 births
1932 deaths
Naval Consulting Board